The  was a class of motor gunboat of the Imperial Japanese Navy, serving from the 1930s to World War II.

Background
In 1934, Manchukuo ordered four gunboats from Japan. The IJN established  to educate them and built two 30-ton motor gunboat Kozakura and Hakubai. In 1939, Kozakura and Hakubai which finished a duties and transferred to Manchukuo Imperial Navy, and the IJN withdrew from Manchukuo.

Ships in class

Footnotes

Bibliography 
The Maru Special, Japanese Naval Vessels No.53, Japanese support vessels,  (Japan), July 1981
50 year History of Harima Zōsen, Harima Zōsen Corporation, November 1960
, National Archives of Japan
Reference code: C05034350900, No. 3814, 1935 September 13, Exhausting Arms supply of constant outside Extraordinary Navy Defense Corps
Reference code: C05034620500, No.3118 July 19, 1935 Sending of 30-ton Traffic Boat's Weapons for Naval Department Stationed in Manchuria by Special Service Vessel Service on Consignment
Reference code: C05034912100, No.1621 April 7, 1936 Cooking Rooms Reform of Launches Kozakura and Hakubai
Reference code: C05035340800, Naval Department in Manchuria Confidential No.6 October 30, 1936 Progression Outline, Achievement and Remarks for Communication Drill Implemented in Fiscal Year 1936 August

Gunboats of the Imperial Japanese Navy
1935 ships